Friedrich Wilhelm Theile (11 November 1801, in Buttstädt – 20 October 1879, in Weimar) was a German physician and anatomist.

In 1825 he received his medical doctorate from the University of Jena with the dissertation-thesis . From 1828, with Heinrich Wilhelm Ferdinand Wackenroder, he was in charge of the pharmaceutical institute at Jena. In 1831 he became an associate professor, and three years later relocated to the University of Bern as a full professor of anatomy. From 1853 he practiced medicine in Weimar, during which time, he largely concerned himself with literary activities.

Selected works 
 Lehre von den Muskeln und Gefäßen des menschlichen Körpers, Volume 3 of the 2nd edition of Samuel Thomas von Soemmerring's Vom Bau des menschlichen Körpers, 1841 – On the muscles and blood vessels of the human body.
 Anatomische Untersuchungen eines Hypospadeus, In: Archiv für Anatomie, Physiologie und wissenschaftliche Medicin, Berlin, 1847: 17-32 – Anatomical investigations of hypospadias.
In addition to his own writings, he translated several works by foreign physicians and scientists — Louis Delasiauve, Franciscus Cornelis Donders, Auguste Ambroise Tardieu, Pieter Harting and Jacobus Schroeder van der Kolk.

Eponymy 
 "Theile's canal": the transverse pericardial sinus.
 "Theile's glands": the glands of biliary mucosa.
 "Theile's muscle": the superficial transverse perineal muscle.

References 

1801 births
1879 deaths
People from Buttstädt
People from Saxe-Weimar
German anatomists
University of Jena alumni
Academic staff of the University of Jena
Academic staff of the University of Bern